Lia Rosita van Gijlswijk  (born 11 February 1974, Noordwijkerhout) is a Dutch politician of the Socialist Party (SP). She was an MP from 2006 to 2008; she was succeeded by Farshad Bashir. From 1999 to 2006, she was a member of the municipal council of Groningen; since 2008, she has again been a councillor of this municipality. In 2007, she was appointed SP treasurer.

References
 Parlement.com biography

1974 births
Living people
Members of the House of Representatives (Netherlands)
Municipal councillors of Groningen (city)
Politicians from Groningen (city)
People from Noordwijkerhout
Socialist Party (Netherlands) politicians
21st-century Dutch politicians
21st-century Dutch women politicians